Krakovany is a village and municipality in Piešťany District in the Trnava Region of western Slovakia.

History
In historical records the village was first mentioned in 1113.

Geography
The municipality lies at an altitude of 165 metres and covers an area of 9.823 km2. It has a population of about 1343 people.

References

External links

https://web.archive.org/web/20090621123522/http://www.statistics.sk/mosmis/eng/run.html
http://www.krakovany.sk/

Villages and municipalities in Piešťany District